Antipater (c. 400 BC319 BC) was a Macedonian general and statesman under the subsequent kingships of Philip II of Macedon and his son, Alexander the Great. In the wake of the collapse of the Argead house, his son Cassander would eventually come to rule Macedonia as a king in his own right.

In 320 BC, Antipater was elected regent of all of Alexander the Great's Empire but died the following year. In a perplexing turn of events, he chose an infantry officer named Polyperchon as his successor instead of his son Cassander, and a two-year-long power struggle (the Second War of the Diadochi) ensued.

Career under Philip and Alexander
Nothing is known of his early career until 342 BC, when he was appointed by Philip to govern Macedon as his regent while the former left for three years of hard and successful campaigning against Thracian and Scythian tribes, which extended Macedonian rule as far as the Hellespont. In 342 BC, when the Athenians tried to assume control of the Euboean towns and expel the pro-Macedonian rulers, he sent Macedonian troops to stop them. In the autumn of the same year, Antipater went to Delphi, as Philip's representative in the Amphictyonic League, a religious organization to which Macedon had been admitted in 346 BC.

After the triumphal Macedonian victory at the Battle of Chaeronea in 338 BC, Antipater was sent as ambassador to Athens (337–336 BC) to negotiate a peace treaty and return the bones of the Athenians who had fallen in the battle.

He started as a great friend to both the young Alexander and the boy's mother, Olympias, and aided Alexander in the struggle to secure his succession after Philip's death, in 336 BC.

He joined Parmenion in advising Alexander the Great not to set out on his Asiatic expedition until he had provided by marriage for the succession to the throne. On the king's departure in 334 BC, he was left regent in Macedonia and made "general (strategos) of Europe", positions he held until 323 BC. The European front was to prove initially quite agitated, and Antipater also had to send reinforcements to the king, as he did while the king was at Gordium in the winter of 334–333 BC.

The Persian fleet under Memnon of Rhodes and Pharnabazus was apparently a considerable danger for Antipater, bringing war in the Aegean sea and threatening war in Europe. Luckily for the regent, Memnon died during the siege of Mytilene on the isle of Lesbos and the remaining fleet dispersed in 333 BC, after Alexander's victory at the Battle of Issus.

More dangerous enemies were nearer home; tribes in Thrace rebelled in 332 BC, led by Memnon of Thrace, the Macedonian governor of the region, followed shortly by the revolt of Agis III, king of Sparta.

The Spartans, who were not members of the League of Corinth and had not participated in Alexander's expedition, saw in the Asian campaign the long-awaited chance to take back control over the Peloponnese after the disastrous defeats at the Battle of Leuctra and Battle of Mantinea. The Persians generously funded Sparta's ambitions, making possible the formation of an army 20,000 strong. After assuming virtual control of Crete, Agis tried to build an anti-Macedonian front. While Athens remained neutral, the Achaeans, Arcadians and Elis became his allies, with the important exception of Megalopolis, the staunchly anti-Spartan capital of Arcadia. In 331 BC Agis started to besiege the city with his entire army, forcing Antipater to act.

So to not have two enemies simultaneously, Antipater pardoned Memnon and even let him keep his office in Thrace, while great sums of money were sent to him by Alexander. This helped to create, with Thessalian help and many mercenaries, a force double that of Agis, which Antipater in person led south in 330 BC to confront the Spartans. In the spring of that year, the two armies clashed near Megalopolis. Agis fell with many of his best soldiers, but not without inflicting heavy losses on the Macedonians.

Utterly defeated, the Spartans sued for peace; the latter's answer was to negotiate directly with the League of Corinth, but the Spartan emissaries preferred to treat directly with Alexander, who imposed on Sparta's allies a penalty of 120 talents and the entrance of Sparta in the league.

Alexander appears to have been quite jealous of Antipater's victory; according to Plutarch, the king wrote in a letter to his viceroy: "It seems, my friends that while we have been conquering Darius here, there has been a battle of mice in Arcadia".

Antipater was disliked for supporting oligarchs and tyrants in Greece, but he also worked with the League of Corinth, built by Philip. In addition, his previously close relationship with the ambitious Olympias greatly deteriorated. Whether from jealousy or from the necessity of guarding against the evil consequences of the dissension between Olympias and Antipater, in 324 BC, Alexander ordered the latter to lead fresh troops into Asia, while Craterus, in charge of discharged veterans returning home, was appointed to take over the regency in Macedon. When Alexander suddenly died in Babylon in 323 BC however, Antipater was able to forestall the transfer of power.

Some later historians, such as Justin in his Historia Philippicae et Totius Mundi Origines et Terrae Situs blamed Antipater for the death of Alexander, accusing him of murdering him through poison. However, this view is disputed by most historians and Alexander is believed to have died of natural causes.

Role in The Lamian and First Diadochi Wars
The new regent, Perdiccas, left Antipater in control of Greece. Antipater faced wars with Athens, Aetolia, and Thessaly that made up the Lamian War, in which southern Greeks attempted to re-assert their political autonomy.

At the onset of this struggle, the Greeks held an apparently decisive numerical advantage, fielding an army of some 25000 troops. Antipater's levies numbered a meager 13000; drawn from a manpower pool that had been severely diminished by the campaigns of Alexander the Great. Furthermore, the Greek coalition was led by a talented general and one-time mercenary named Leosthenes, who had fought under Alexander and had seen first-hand the functions of the Macedonian war machine.

An initial engagement with this coalition around the historic pass of Thermopylae saw Antipater's Thessalian cavalry defect to the opposing side. Already outnumbered and now without a cavalry contingent, Antipater fought a token battle but was ultimately defeated and forced to retreat north to the Thessalian city of Lamia. Behind its stout defenses he endured a siege. By some unknown means he began desperately passing correspondence to would-be allies through the Athenian siege lines. In 322 BC he was relieved when Leonnatus, the satrap of Hellespontine Phrygia, responded to his call for aid and arrived in southern Thessaly with a force to break the investment.

Although Leonnatus fell in the ensuing battle, the Athenian coalition had been forced to use the entirety of its dwindling army (many of the Aetolian and Thessalian contingents having left the siege to tend to the harvest) to face him. Leonnatus' infantry retreated into rough country where the Aetolian and Thessalian cavalry could not pursue them, and survived the debacle largely unscathed.

This turn of events allowed Antipater to slip out of the walls of Lamia before striking north for Macedonia, where he awaited the arrival of further reinforcements from Asia. Along the way he assumed control of Leonnatus' infantry corps, absorbing them into the remnants of his initial army.

Craterus, another decorated general, had also received Antipater's call for aid and arrived at Pella with a force of 16000 discharged veterans who had marched and fought under Alexander. The two generals made common cause, and to cement this new alliance Antipater married his daughter Phila to Craterus.

The two then led a massive, combined force south to fight a final, decisive battle against the Greeks. Antipater defeated them at the Battle of Crannon in 322 BC, with Craterus' help, and broke up the coalition. At a peace treaty in the ruined city of Thebes, Antipater negotiated with an Athenian delegation led by Phocion and Demades. Here he imposed a rule of oligarchy upon Athens and demanded the surrender of Demosthenes and Hypereides (the foremost instigators of the revolt), the former committing suicide to escape capture, while the later was imprisoned before having his tongue ripped from his mouth in a brutal execution. Later in the same year Antipater and Craterus were engaged in a mopping-up campaign against recalcitrant pockets of Aetolian resurgence  when they received the news from Antigonus in Asia Minor that Perdiccas contemplated making himself outright ruler of the empire. Antipater and Craterus accordingly concluded peace with the Aetolians (much to the chagrin of future of Macedonian rulers) and went to war against Perdiccas, allying themselves with Ptolemy, the satrap of Egypt. Antipater married another of his daughters (Eurydike) to Ptolemy to strengthen this new alliance. Together with Craterus and his son Cassander, he then crossed over into Asia at the head of a considerable force in 321 BC. While in Phrygia, this army was divided in two; one under Craterus marching east into Cappadocia to face Eumenes, while the later under Antipater struck south to fight Perdiccas. While still in Syria, Antipater received two letters that drastically changed the power dynamic of the successor struggle at that point; firstly that Perdiccas had been murdered by his own soldiers in Egypt, and secondly that in one of the greatest upsets of the Hellenistic age, Craterus had fallen in battle against Eumenes (Diodorus xviii. 25–39).

Regent of the Empire
In the treaty of Triparadisus (321 BC), Antipater participated in a new division of Alexander's great kingdom. He appointed himself supreme regent of all Alexander's empire and was left in Greece as guardian of Alexander's son Alexander IV and his disabled brother Philip III.

Having quelled a mutiny of his troops and commissioned Antigonus to continue the war against Eumenes and the other partisans of Perdiccas, Antipater returned to Macedonia, arriving there in 320 BC (Justin xiii. 6). Soon after, he was seized by an illness which terminated his active career.

Death and struggle for succession

Antipater died of old age in 319 BC, at the age of 81. By his side was his son Cassander.

Controversially, Antipater did not appoint Cassander to succeed him as regent, citing as the reason for his decision Cassander's relative youth (at the time of Antipater's passing, Cassander was 36). Over Cassander, Antipater chose the aged officer Polyperchon as regent.

Cassander became indignant at this, believing that he'd earned the right to become regent by virtue of his loyalty and experience. Thus he appealed to general Antigonus to assist him in battling Polyperchon for the position.

In 317 BC, after two years of war with Polyperchon, Cassander emerged victorious. Cassander would go on to rule Macedonia for nineteen years, first as regent and later as king, ultimately founding the Antipatrid dynasty.

Family
Antipater was one of the sons of a Macedonian nobleman called Iollas or Iolaus and his family were distant collateral relatives to the Argead dynasty. Antipater was originally from the Macedonian city of Paliura; had a brother called Cassander; was the paternal uncle of Cassander's child Antigone and was the maternal great uncle of Berenice I of Egypt.

Antipater had ten children from various unknown wives. His daughters were:
 Phila, wife of Balacrus, Craterus and Demetrius I of Macedon.
 Eurydice, wife of Ptolemy I Soter. Her son Meleager would rule Macedonia for two months in 279 BC.
 Nicaea, wife of Perdiccas and Lysimachus.

His sons were:
 Iollas
 Cassander, King of Macedonia
 Pleistarchus, a general and governor in his brother's service.
 Phillip, also a military commander under his brother.
 Nicanor
 Alexarchus
 Perilaus

Literary works
Antipater was a student of Aristotle. Aristotle named him as executor-in-charge of his will, when he died in 322 BC.
According to Suidas, Antipater left a compilation of letters in 2 books and a history, called The Illyrian Deeds of Perdikkas (Περδίκκου πράξεις Ιλλυριακαί).

References

Further reading
 
 
 Smith, William (editor); Dictionary of Greek and Roman Biography and Mythology, "Antipater", Boston, (1867)

External links
 Antipater from Livius.org (Jona Lendering)
 Wiki Classical Dictionary: Antipater

4th-century BC viceregal rulers
4th-century BC Macedonians
4th-century BC Greek people
400s BC births
319 BC deaths
Ancient Greek generals
Regents of Macedonia (ancient kingdom)
Ancient Macedonian generals
Generals of Alexander the Great
Conspirators against Alexander the Great
Ancient Macedonian historians
Hellenistic-era historians
Antipatrid dynasty